Leptosaurus is a genus of sphenodont from the Late Jurassic of Bavaria, southern Germany.

Kallimodon, at times synonymized with Leptosaurus, is actually a distinct genus more closely related to Sapheosaurus.

References

Sphenodontia
Late Jurassic reptiles of Europe